The Briheni is a left tributary of the river Crișul Negru in Romania. It flows into the Crișul Negru in Șuștiu.

References

Rivers of Romania
Rivers of Bihor County